Mesquite Creek is an unincorporated community and census-designated place (CDP) in Mohave County, Arizona, United States. The population was 403 at the 2020 census.

Geography
Mesquite Creek is located in western Mohave County at  (34.966035, -114.567769). It is bordered to the north by the CDP of Fort Mohave.

Demographics

As of the census of 2000, there were 205 people, 106 households, and 73 families residing in the CDP. The racial makeup of the CDP was 93% White, 1% Black or African American, 1% Native American, 2% from other races, and 3% from two or more races.  7% of the population were Hispanic or Latino of any race.

There were 106 households, out of which 2% had children under the age of 18 living with them, 64% were married couples living together, 3% had a female householder with no husband present, and 31% were non-families. 26% of all households were made up of individuals, and 18% had someone living alone who was 65 years of age or older.  The average household size was 1.93 and the average family size was 2.23.

In the CDP, the population was spread out, with 6% under the age of 18, 1% from 18 to 24, 7% from 25 to 44, 42% from 45 to 64, and 45% who were 65 years of age or older.  The median age was 64 years. For every 100 females, there were 93.4 males.  For every 100 females age 18 and over, there were 92.0 males.

The median income for a household in the CDP was $33,125, and the median income for a family was $34,861. Males had a median income of $26,250 versus $23,750 for females. The per capita income for the CDP was $20,517.  None of the families, and 7% of the population were living below the poverty line, including no under eighteens and 14% of those over 64.

References

Census-designated places in Mohave County, Arizona
Arizona placenames of Native American origin